Pinnacles is a rural locality in the City of Townsville, Queensland, Australia. It is a future urban growth area with many estates already planned.

Geography 
Most of the terrain in the locality is mountainous rising to peaks such Frederick's Peak (679 metres) and South Pinnacle (729 metres, just west of the locality in neighbouring Granite Vale); this is undeveloped bushland. The lower flatter terrain around the northern and eastern boundaries is used for farming. The eastern boundary is the Ross River and Lake Ross (created by the Ross River Dam just to the north-east of the locality in Kelso).

References 

City of Townsville
Localities in Queensland